Rieder is a village and a former municipality in the district of Harz, in Saxony-Anhalt, Germany. Since 1 December 2013, it is part of the town Ballenstedt. Between 1 January 2011 and 19 February 2013, it was part of the town Quedlinburg.

There is a grauwacke quarry here which is also checkpoint 61 on the Harzer Wandernadel.

References 

Former municipalities in Saxony-Anhalt
Ballenstedt
Duchy of Anhalt